The ISG business school or Institut Superieur de Gestion, is a major business school, based in Paris, France.

It was founded in 1967 by a group of French CEOs led by Pierre-Alexandre Dumas.

In 1983, ISG opened its own campuses in New York and Tokyo. Nowadays ISG is associated with more than 160 universities on the 5 continents.

ISG delivers BBAs and MBAs. Majors of the Grande Ecole master are Marketing, Finance, Technology and Luxury management.

ISG is fully accredited by the french ministry of education to award degrees on behalf of the state.

ISG has 10 campuses across France and Europe and is a member of the IONIS Education Group, the largest private group in France in terms of student population and endowment.

ISG is member of AACSB, EFMD, CLADEA, AMCHAM, UGEI, CGE.

History

ISG Paris was founded in 1967. In 1982 and 1984, the campuses of Tokyo and New York City were inaugurated. The university concluded its first partnership with China in 1985. In 1997, the university joined the IONIS Education Group. In 2004, the diploma was recognized by French Ministry of National Education and the university was accredited by IACBE before becoming a member of UNIDO in 2006. In 2007, the university was accredited by ACBSP before being recognized by French State to deliver a Master's degree in 2009. The same year, the school became a member of AACSB. On 10 April 2012, the ISG became a member of the Conférence des grandes écoles.

Since 2013, IONIS Education Group wants to develop day-time or night school education for employees provided by companies by developing programs based on the 11 Master of Business Administration degrees of the university. It has a double degree agreement with the EAN University of Bogotá, Colombia.

In 2014, ISG Business School launched a subsidiary specialized in luxury, fashion and design called Moda Domani Institute. Now ISG Luxury Management.

In 2021, ISG launched a new program in sport management accredited by the NBA: ISG Sport Management.

Notable alumni

References

External links
  Official website
  Alumni website

Educational institutions established in 1967
Business schools in France
Education in Paris
Grandes écoles
16th arrondissement of Paris